Birat Gold Cup (Nepali: विराट गोल्डकप, previously called the Mahendra Gold Cup) is an annual football tournament held in Biratnagar, the second largest metropolitan city of Nepal. It has been held at the Sahid Rangsala stadium in Biratnagar, Morang, Nepal every year since 2012 A.D.  The event witnesses participation from several national and international teams, and is amongst the most sought after football tournament of the nation.

The tournament for the year 2077 B.S. (2021 A.D.) is scheduled to night matches and would supposedly be the first Nepalese tournament to do so outside Kathmandu valley. A total of 10 participating teams from across 2 nations (Nepal and India) are scheduled to play for the cup this year.

History
Birat Gold Cup football tournament began in the initial years as Mahendra Gold Cup and was named after late King Mahendra . Mahendra Gold Cup 2004 was held in Biratnagar. In 2012, Mahendra Gold Cup was renamed to Birat Gold Cup.

2015 Birat Gold Cup
2015 Birat Gold Cup was planned with an estimated budget NRs 7.7 million. Tribhuwan Army Club and Jhapa XI reached the final of the Tournament. Jhapa XI defeated  Tribhuwan Army Club 2-1 to clinch the title.

2016 Birat Gold Cup
2016 Birat Gold Cup was hosted on Sahid Rangsala, Biratnagar by Morang Football Club. In the final match, Nepal Police Club clinched title victory by defeating Jhapa XI 1-0 when Bharat Shah scored the only goal of the match. Shah found the post wide open when Jhapa XI goalkeeper Binay Shrestha went on to clear the ball in the 87th minute. Suman Subedi of Nepal Police Club was adjudged Player of the Tournament.

2018 Birat Gold Cup 
The 2018 Birat Gold Cup is scheduled for March 31 - April 9. The 10 participating teams are: 
 Thimpu Football Club, Bhutan
 Nepal Army Club, Kathmandu
 Mohammedan Sporting Club, Kolkata
 Sashatra Prahari Bal Team, Kathmandu
 Bangladesh Sporting Club, Bangladesh
 Manang Marsyangdi Club, Kathmandu
 Nepal Police Club, Kathmandu
 Rumpum Jhapa 11, Jhapa
 Three Star Club, Kathmandu
 Rijalco Morang 11, Morang
The major sponsors of the event in year 2018 are RUMPUM, Noodles & Maruti Cement

2021 Birat Gold Cup 
The 2021 Birat Gold Cup is scheduled for April 8 - April. The 10 participating teams are:

 African Roots Association, Kathmandu
 Nepal A.P.F. Club, Kathmandu
 Biratnagar Metropolitan, Biratnagar
 Gorkha Boys Club, Rupandehi
 Machhindra Club, Kathmandu
 Nepal Police Club, Kathmandu
 Punjab Police FC
 Sankata Club, Kathmandu
 Siliguri United Football Club
 United Sikkim Football Club

Results

Performance

See also
Sahid Rangsala
Pokhara Gold Cup
Aaha! Gold Cup
Simara Gold Cup

References

Football in Nepal
Football cup competitions in Nepal
2012 establishments in Nepal